The 1982 Auburn Tigers football team represented Auburn University in the 1982 NCAA Division I-A football season.  Coached by Pat Dye, the team finished the season with a 9–3 record.  Auburn ended Alabama's nine-game winning streak in the famous "Bo Over the Top" Iron Bowl, and went on to defeat Boston College in the 1982 Tangerine Bowl.

Schedule

Personnel

References

Auburn
Auburn Tigers football seasons
Citrus Bowl champion seasons
Auburn Tigers football